Acradenia frankliniae , commonly known as whitey wood or whity wood, is a species of shrub or small tree that is endemic to Tasmania. It has glandular-warty branchlets, trifoliate leaves with narrow elliptic to lance-shaped leaflets, and panicles of white flowers in leaf axils and on the ends of branchlets.

Description
The leaves are trifoliate, the leaflets narrow elliptic to lance-shaped with the narrower end towards the base, sometimes wavy near the tip and have prominent glands. Flowering occurs from November to February and mature fruits have been recorded from February to May.

Taxonomy
Acradenia frankliniae was first formally described in 1853 by Richard Kippist in the Proceedings of the Linnean Society of London. The specific epithet (frankiniae) honours "Lady Franklin".

Distribution and habitat

References

External links 

frankliniae
Sapindales of Australia
Flora of Tasmania
Endemic flora of Tasmania
Plants described in 1853
Taxa named by Richard Kippist